Sturridge is an English surname. Notable people with the surname include:

Film and television
Charles Sturridge (born 1951), English screenwriter, producer and director
Matilda Sturridge (born 1988), English actress
Tom Sturridge (born 1985), English actor

Football
Daniel Sturridge (born 1989), English footballer, plays for Perth Glory
Dean Sturridge (born 1973), English former footballer, mostly played for Derby and Wolves 
Mike Sturridge (born 1962), English former footballer, played briefly for Wrexham 
Simon Sturridge (born 1969), English former footballer, mostly played for Birmingham and Stoke 

English-language surnames